The 14th Moscow International Film Festival was held from 28 June to 12 July 1985. The Golden Prizes were awarded to the Soviet film Come and See directed by Elem Klimov, the American film A Soldier's Story directed by Norman Jewison and the Greek film The Descent of the Nine directed by Christos Siopahas.

Jury
 Sergei Gerasimov (USSR – President of the Jury)
 Shyam Benegal (India)
 Renate Blume (East Germany)
 Paulin Vieyra (Senegal)
 Jerzy Hoffman (Poland)
 Daisy Granados (Cuba)
 Giuseppe De Santis (Italy)
 Nikos Koundouros (Greece)
 István Nemeskürty (Hungary)
 Kōhei Oguri (Japan)
 Badrahin Sumhu (Mongolia)
 Francois Chavan (France)
 Eldar Shengelaia (USSR)
 Rostislav Yurenev (USSR)
 Robert Young (USA)

Films in competition
The following films were selected for the main competition:

Awards
 Golden Prizes:
 Come and See by Elem Klimov
 A Soldier's Story by Norman Jewison
 The Descent of the Nine by Christos Siopahas
 Silver Prizes:
 Unseen Wonder by Živko Nikolić
 Woman in a Hat by Stanisław Różewicz
 Avaete, Seed of Revenge by Zelito Viana
 Special Prizes:
 Hell Train by Roger Hanin
 Saaransh by Mahesh Bhatt
 On the Threshold by Leif Erlsboe
 Prizes:
 Best Actor: Lars Simonsen for Twist and Shout
 Best Actor: Detlev Kügow for Wodzeck
 Best Actress: Juli Básti for The Red Countess
 Best Actress: Choi Eun-hee for Salt
 Prix FIPRESCI: Come and See by Elem Klimov

References

External links
Moscow International Film Festival: 1985 at Internet Movie Database

1985
1985 film festivals
1985 in Moscow